Männiku training area is one of the six military training fields used by the Estonian Defence Forces. It is located just outside the capital of Estonia, Tallinn, in Kiili and Saku municipalities.

History 
During the Soviet occupation of Estonia, Männiku training area was used by the Soviet Army, its area was 1173 ha.

Establishment 
Männiku training area was established on 11 September 2008, with the Government Order No. 394 "Establishment of the Defense Forces Männiku training area."

See also 
Keskpolügoon

References 

Military installations of Estonia
Saku Parish
Kiili Parish